Franklin Mokros, also known professionally as Totakeke, is a NY-based electronic music producer who sometimes also goes by the names of Synthetik, and Ativ.  As Totakeke, Mokros explores a musical aesthetic where the focus lies more within the atmosphere, tension, and individual elements of sound, combining layers of dark, spacey ambience with intricate, slowly evolving analog rhythmic patterns (both distorted and clean), while precision synth sequences interweave throughout the mixes. This contrasts with the more high-BPM style and pure aggression of his other projects (under his other musical aliases).

Discography
Releases:
Lament on Frozen Empire Media, 2003
At the Train Station on a Saturday Evening on Frozen Empire Media, 2004
Elekatota - The Other Side Of The Tracks on Tympanik Audio, 2008
Forgotten On The Other Side Of The Tracks on Tympanik Audio, 2008
The Things That Disappear When I Close My Eyes on Tympanik Audio, 2009
On The First Of November on Tympanik Audio, 2010
Digital Exorcist on Tympanik Audio, 2013
me.tem.psy.cho.sis on Hands Productions, 2014
Telematic on Hands Productions, 2018

Appears on:
Emerging Organisms compilation on Tympanik Audio, 2007
Emerging Organisms vol. 2 compilation on Tympanik Audio, 2008

External links
MySpace
Discogs
Bandcamp

Living people
American electronic musicians
Year of birth missing (living people)